Manwood Green is a hamlet in the Uttlesford district, in the county of Essex. Manwood Green was Man(e)wode(s)grene in 1272.

It is on Sparrows Lane (a minor road), approximately 2 km from the A1060 road. The nearest local amenities are situated in the villages of Hatfield Heath, Matching Green and White Roding. Its post town is Chelmsford.

References 

Hamlets in Essex
Uttlesford